Walter John Buchanan (2 April 1891 – 20 October 1957) was a Scottish theatre and film actor, singer, dancer, producer and director. He was known for three decades as the embodiment of the debonair man-about-town in the tradition of George Grossmith Jr., and was described by The Times as "the last of the knuts." He is best known in America for his role in the classic Hollywood musical The Band Wagon in 1953.

Biography
Buchanan was born in Helensburgh, Dunbartonshire, Scotland, the son of Walter John Buchanan Sr (1865–1902), auctioneer, and his wife, Patricia, née  McWatt (1860–1936). He was educated at the Glasgow Academy.

Early career
After a brief attempt to follow his late father's profession and a failure at acting in Glasgow, he became a music hall comedian under the name of Chump Buchanan and appeared on the variety stage in Scotland. Moving to London and adopting the name  "Jack Buchanan", he first appeared on the West End in September 1912 in the comic opera The Grass Widow  at the Apollo Theatre. Hardship dogged him for a while before he became famous whilst on tour in 1915 in Tonight's the Night. He produced and acted in his own plays both in London and New York City. 

Buchanan's health was not robust, and, to his regret, was declared unfit when he attempted to enlist for military service in the First World War. He appeared with some success in West End shows during the war, attracting favourable notices as a "knut" in the mould of George Grossmith Jr, and achieved front rank stardom in André Charlot's 1921 revue A to Z, appearing with Gertrude Lawrence. Among his numbers in the show was Ivor Novello's "And Her Mother Came Too", which became Buchanan's signature song. The show transferred successfully to Broadway in 1924. For the rest of the 1920s and 1930s he was famous for "the seemingly lazy but most accomplished grace with which he sang, danced, flirted and joked his way through musical shows....  The tall figure, the elegant gestures, the friendly drawling voice, the general air of having a good time." During the Second World War he starred in his own musical production It's Time to Dance, whose cast included Fred Emney. The musical show was based on a book by Douglas Furber and L. Arthur Rose, and was staged at the Lyric Theatre, Shaftesbury Avenue, London.

Film career and later years
He made his film debut in the silent cinema, in 1917 and appeared in about three dozen films in his career. In 1938, Buchanan achieved the unusual feat of starring in the London stage musical This'll Make You Whistle while concurrently filming a film version.  The film was released while the stage version was still running; thus the two productions competed with each other. Other starring roles included Monte Carlo (1930), Smash and Grab (1937) and The Gang's All Here (1939). He also produced several films including Happidrome (1943) and The Sky's the Limit (1938), which he also directed. He continued to work on Broadway and the West End and took roles in several Hollywood musicals, including The Band Wagon (1953), his best-known film, in which he plays camp theatre director Jeffrey Cordova opposite Fred Astaire and Cyd Charisse. He suffered from spinal arthritis, though this did not stop him from performing several dance numbers with Astaire in The Band Wagon.

British stage career
Buchanan's British stage appearances included A to Z, Battling Butler, Toni, Sunny, That's a Good Girl, Stand up and Sing, Mr. Whittington, This'll Make You Whistle, Top Hat and Tails, The Last of Mrs Cheyney, Fine Feathers, Canaries Sometimes Sing, Don't Listen, Ladies!, Castle in the Air, King's Rhapsody and As Long as They're Happy. His first pantomime appearance (Christmas, 1940) was as "Buttons" in Cinderella.

His productions included The Women, The Body was Well Nourished, Waltz Without End, It's Time to Dance, A Murder for a Valentine, Treble Trouble and The Lady Asks for Help.

American stage career
Buchanan's American stage appearances included: André Charlot's Revues, Charles B. Cochran's Wake Up and Dream, Pardon My English, Between the Devil and Harvey (1948).

Film career
Buchanan's Hollywood films included Paris, The Show of Shows (1929), Monte Carlo (1930) and The Band Wagon (1953).

His British films included Yes, Mr Brown (1933), Goodnight, Vienna (1932), That's a Good Girl (1933), Brewster's Millions (1935), Come Out of the Pantry (1935), When Knights Were Bold (1936), This'll Make You Whistle (1936), Smash and Grab (1937), The Sky's the Limit (1938), Break the News (1938), The Gang's All Here (1939), The Middle Watch (1940), Bulldog Sees It Through (1940), As Long as They're Happy (1955) and Josephine and Men (1955). He made one French film (bilingual), The Diary of Major Thompson (1955).

Radio and television
Buchanan was a frequent broadcaster on British radio, especially during the Second World War. Programmes included The Jack Buchanan Show and, in 1955, the hugely popular eight-part series Man About Town.

On 12 June 1928, Buchanan participated in the first-ever transatlantic television broadcast.  It was conducted by Scottish engineer John Logie Baird, an important figure in the technological development of television.  At the time, the few television sets that existed had been custom-built by engineers and were not available for purchase by the general public in the United Kingdom or the United States.

American television shows on which Buchanan appeared during the era of stores selling television sets included Max Liebman's Spotlight in 1954 and The Ed Sullivan Show.

Business interests
In a British tradition of actor-management, Buchanan frequently produced his own shows, many of which were premiered in the Alhambra Theatre, Glasgow. He was also heavily involved in the more commercial side of British show business. He was responsible, with partners, for the building and ownership of the Leicester Square Theatre, London, and the Imperial in Brighton. He also controlled the Garrick Theatre in the West End of London and the King's Theatre in Hammersmith. Jack Buchanan Productions (in which his partners were J. Arthur Rank and Charles Woolf) owned Riverside Studios in Hammersmith.

He had been at school with the pioneer of television John Logie Baird and with him co-owned Television Limited, which manufactured and rented televisions.

Not all his business ventures were profitable, and at his death his estate was valued for probate (in 1958) at £24,489 (equivalent to £ today).

Marriage
Buchanan's image was that of the raffish eternal bachelor, but he was, unknown to most, married to Saffo Arnau in 1915. She was a singer. This marriage was annulled in 1920.

Later in life, he married Susan Bassett, an American, in 1947; he was her second husband. Through her he had a stepdaughter, Theo, who lived with him and his wife. He had no children of his own.

He had previously had a relationship with Australian actress Coral Browne, and during her meeting in Moscow with Soviet spy Guy Burgess in the late 1950s she informed Burgess, on mentioning Buchanan, that "we almost got married'. "And...?" "He jilted me."  Burgess, previously at the British Foreign Office, had defected to Moscow a few years earlier, and one of the few mementoes of his earlier life that he had been able to keep was one 78rpm Jack Buchanan record—"Who?"—which, when Browne visited his Moscow flat, he played repeatedly. This event is portrayed in Alan Bennett's play An Englishman Abroad.

Character
Buchanan was noted for his portrayals of the quintessential English gentleman, despite being a Scot. He was known for his financial generosity to less prosperous actors and chorus performers. Sandy Wilson recalled that each year during the running of the annual Grand National horse race, Buchanan would cancel that day's performance of his current musical and charter an excursion train to the racecourse and back, supplying meals for the entire cast and crew of his show, in addition to giving them £5 each for a "flutter" on the horse of their choice. 

Buchanan died in London in 1957 from spinal cancer at age 66.

Partial filmography

 Auld Lang Syne (1917) – Vane
 Her Heritage (1919) – Bob Hales
 The Audacious Mr. Squire (1923) – Tom Squire
 The Happy Ending (1925) – Captain Dale Conway
 Settled Out of Court (1925) – The Husband
 Bulldog Drummond's Third Round (1925) – Captain Hugh Drummond
 A Typical Budget (1925, Short)
 Confetti (1928) – Count Andrea Zorro
 Toni (1928) – Toni Marr / Marini
 Paris (1929) – Guy Pennell
 The Show of Shows (1929)
 Monte Carlo (1930) – Count Rudolph Farriere
 A Man of Mayfair (1931) – Lord William
 Goodnight, Vienna (1932) – Captain Maximilian Schletoff
 Yes, Mr Brown (1933) – Nicholas Baumann
 That's a Good Girl (1933) – Jack Barrow
 Brewster's Millions (1935) – Jack Brewster
 Come Out of the Pantry (1935) – Lord Robert Brent
 When Knights Were Bold (1936) – Sir Guy De Vere
 This'll Make You Whistle (1936) – Bill Hoppings
 Smash and Grab (1937) – John Forrest
 Limelight (1937) – Himself (uncredited)
 Break the News (1938) – Teddy Enton
 The Sky's the Limit (1938) – Dave Harber
 The Gang's All Here (1939) – John Forrest
 The Middle Watch (1940) – Captain Maitland
 Bulldog Sees It Through (1940) – 'Bulldog' Bill Watson
 The Band Wagon (1953) – Jeffrey Cordova
 As Long as They're Happy (1955) – John Bentley
 Josephine and Men (1955) – Uncle Charles Luton
 The French, They Are a Funny Race (1955) – Le Major Marmaduke Thompson

Box office ranking
For a number of years, British film exhibitors voted him among the top ten British stars at the box office via an annual poll in the Motion Picture Herald.
1936 – 6th
1937 – 5th
1938 – 6th

References

External links
 

 Jack Buchanan's biography at Helensburgh Heroes
 Photographs and literature
 

Scottish male film actors
Scottish male musical theatre actors
1891 births
1957 deaths
People from Helensburgh
Deaths from cancer in England
Neurological disease deaths in England
Deaths from spinal cancer
20th-century Scottish male actors
20th-century Scottish male singers
People educated at the Glasgow Academy
Columbia Records artists